Lake Charles (French: Lac Charles) is the fifth-largest incorporated city in the U.S. state of Louisiana, and the parish seat of Calcasieu Parish, located on Lake Charles, Prien Lake, and the Calcasieu River. Founded in 1861 in Calcasieu Parish, it is a major industrial, cultural, and educational center in the southwest region of the state. As of the 2020 U.S. census, Lake Charles's population was 84,872.

The city and metropolitan area of Lake Charles is considered a regionally significant center of petrochemical refining, gambling, tourism, and education, being home to McNeese State University and Sowela Technical Community College. Because of the lakes and waterways throughout the city, metropolitan Lake Charles is often called the Lake Area.

History

On March 7, 1861, Lake Charles was incorporated as the town of Charleston, Louisiana.

Lake Charles was founded by merchant and tradesman Marco Eliche (or Marco de Élitxe) as an outpost. He was a Sephardic Jewish trader of either Basque-Spanish or Venetian-Italian origins. He had arrived in Louisiana after hitchhiking and was invited onto a Spanish vessel due to his determination and loyalty to volunteer and work freely for the Spanish Empire. Long before incorporation and even before the Louisiana Purchase, other names for Lake Charles were Porte du Lafitte (Port of Jean Lafitte) or Rivière Lafitte (River Lafitte/Lafitte's River), among many other names now lost. Eliche had also founded other outposts and towns in Louisiana prior, most notably Marksville, which is named after him. There are also urban tales he had planned to name the settlement Nouveau Cadix (New Cádiz)", after the city in Spain, but this is uncertain.

The town was first incorporated in 1857 as Charleston, after an early settler, Charles Sallier. Ten years later, on March 16, 1867, Charleston was reincorporated as the City of Lake Charles. The Great Fire of April 1910 devastated much of the city.

Lake Charles soon rebuilt, grew and expanded in the twentieth century. The Charleston Hotel was completed in 1929, during the administration of Mayor Henry J. Geary. During and after World War II, Lake Charles experienced industrial growth with the arrival of petrochemical refineries. The city grew to a high of some 75,000 people in the early 1980s, but with local economic recession, the population declined and stagnated. In 1985, the city was identified as a potential Strategic Homeport to support Navy Secretary John Lehman's desire for a 600-ship Navy. Support ships were to be operated from the new Naval Station Lake Charles; but with the tailing-off of the Cold War, the 1988 Base Realignment and Closure Commission recommended it be closed. By 1991, the incomplete base was dropped from the program and shuttered.

In 2005, the city was heavily damaged by Hurricane Rita. In 2020, it was battered by two hurricanes, Category 4 Hurricane Laura on August 26–27, and Hurricane Delta on October 9, 2020.

The southern portion of the city was damaged by an EF2 tornado on October 27, 2021.

Geography

It borders both Lake Charles and Prien Lake. Contraband Bayou, Henderson Bayou, and English Bayou flow through the city. Oak trees and pine trees dot the landscape; the lumber industry was once the main economic engine of the area. The Calcasieu Ship Channel, which allows large ocean-going vessels to sail up from the Gulf, also borders the city.

Climate
Lake Charles is tied with Port Arthur, Texas, and Astoria, Oregon, as the most humid city in the contiguous United States, and the second-most humid measured location behind unincorporated Quillayute, Washington. The average relative humidity in Lake Charles is 90% in the morning, and 72% in the afternoon.

Hurricanes 
Hurricane Laura devastated the city in 2020. The National Weather Service called the storm surge "unsurvivable" with one-minute sustained wind speeds of 150 mph (240 km/h). Numerous trees were blown down. The Lake Charles Regional Airport saw a gust of 128 miles per hour (206 km/h) as well as multiple hangars destroyed. Another gust in the city reached 137 miles per hour (220 km/h). Many windows were blown out of Capital One Tower downtown. A communications tower collapsed onto the KPLC studio building (which had been evacuated) and part of a sky bridge was blown out. The radar at the NWS Lake Charles forecast office (whose staff evacuated, with the office's operations transferred to the Brownsville, Texas office) was destroyed around the time of landfall, with its dome and much of its internal equipment sheared from the radar tower's base. A few weeks later, Hurricane Delta also hit Lake Charles.

Demographics

Lake Charles is the principal city of the Lake Charles metropolitan statistical area, which had a population of 202,040 as of 2013. It is the larger principal city of the Lake Charles-Jennings combined statistical area, with a population of 225,235. The 2010 population of the five-parish region of Southwest Louisiana was 292,619. For the city proper of Lake Charles at the 2020 census, it had a population of 84,872, with a population density of 1,890 people per square mile among 38,434 housing units. In 2010, the population was 71,993, reflecting a rebound from its 1990 population of 70,580.

In 2010, the median income for a household in the city was $36,001. The per capita income for the city was $22,855. 20.9% of the population was below the poverty line; in 2020, the median income for a household in the city was $37,894. 26.7% of the population was below the poverty line. The average commute time was 22.4 minutes.

Race and ethnicity

The 2010 census determined that the racial and ethnic makeup for the city was 47% African American, 46% White <1% Native American, 2% Asian, 1% from other races, 2% from two or more races. Hispanic or Latino people of any race were 3% of the population. In 2020, the U.S. Census Bureau reported that the racial and ethnic makeup for Lake Charles was 46.2% Black or African American, 42.5% non-Hispanic white, 0.4% American Indian and Alaska Native, 2.6% Asian, 2.6% some other race, 5.6% two or more races, and 5.6% Hispanic or Latino American of any race.

Religion
In common with most of the American South, Christianity in the predominant religion in the Lake Area. According to the Association of Religion Data Archives in 2020, the Roman Catholic Church is the area's largest individual Christian denomination, with 51,161 adherents in Calcasieu Parish alone. The Southern Baptist Convention was the city and area's second largest denomination, followed by non-denominational Protestant churches. Other prominent Christian denominations have included the United Methodist Church, National Baptist Convention, USA, Churches of Christ, Church of God in Christ, and the Assemblies of God USA.

Additionally, outside of Christianity, there were an estimated 354 adherents of Islam in the city and metropolitan area. According to Dwellics and Sperling's BestPlaces, there is also a small Jewish population.

Crime
In 2018, the violent crime rate in the Lake Charles area was of the highest in the United States, across communities of all sizes (both large and small). Violent offenses tracked include rape, murder and non-negligent manslaughter, armed robbery, and aggravated assault, including assault with a deadly weapon. Lake Charles is safer than 13% of cities in the United States. For every 100,000 people, 13.11 daily crimes occur in Lake Charles. Year over year, crime in Lake Charles has decreased by 25%.

Economy

The top employer, the Calcasieu Parish School System, employs approximately 5,000 workers. The second-largest employer is L'Auberge Casino Resort, which has 2,400 workers.

Industry and manufacturing
Several petrochemical plants and an oil refinery are located nearby along the Calcasieu Ship Channel. Turner Industries, Westlake Chemical Corporation, and Citgo each employ over a thousand people. The Trunkline LNG terminal, immediately southwest of Lake Charles, is one of the United States' few liquified natural gas terminals. It has facilities for LNG receipt, storage, and re-gasification. Other industrial companies include PPG Industries, Phillips 66, Sasol, and W. R. Grace. Local industry also includes a number of manufacturing companies. Chennault International Airport hosts AAR Corp, which services airplanes, and a Northrop Grumman facility. The Shaw Group has a manufacturing facility which manufactures and exports parts for nuclear power plants.

Commerce and retail
With small businesses, big box stores, and a regional mall, Lake Charles serves as the shopping and retail hub of the five-parish area. Prien Lake Mall, which serves nearly 300,000 people is anchored by three department stores: Dillard's, Kohl's, and JCPenney. It has over 80 retail options. Retailers include Talbots, Gap, Aéropostale, Bath & Body Works, Ulta Beauty, Express, American Eagle, Buckle, Spencer's, and Hollister. The Lake Charles Power Center is a shopping area that has  of shopping space. The Cottage Shop District supports approximately a dozen small businesses. L'Auberge du Lac Casino Resort offers upscale clothing boutiques.

Casinos

Lake Charles has Louisiana's biggest casino market. It has nearly 1000 guest rooms, a casino, golf course, spa, and meeting center. A second casino, the Golden Nugget Lake Charles, opened in 2014 next to L'Auberge du Lac. The 18-story casino resort hotel has more than 740 guest rooms, a casino, golf course, meeting space, retail corridor and a private beach and marina.

While Horseshoe Lake Charles is technically in one of the city's suburbs known as Westlake, Louisiana, it forms part of the city's gambling market along  with Delta Downs in Vinton, Louisiana and  Coushatta Casino Resort in Kinder, Louisiana.

Arts and culture

Lake Charles has a Creole and Cajun culture because of its location in Southwest Louisiana—an extension of Acadiana.

The city has its own symphony orchestra, the Lake Charles Symphony. It was founded in 1938 and hosts concerts at the Rosa Hart Theatre, which has a capacity of over 2,000.

The Lake Charles Little Theatre was founded in 1927 and is the second oldest community theater in Louisiana.

Lake Charles is home to a number of museums and art galleries. The largest, the Imperial Calcasieu Museum, features a permanent historical exhibit with artifacts and an art gallery. Its grounds are home to the Sallier oak tree, which is around 400 years old. The Historic City Hall Arts and Cultural Center is used as exhibition space; moving art exhibits are displayed at this public art gallery each month. It also hosts the Charlestown Farmers' Market, which provides a venue for local farmers and merchants to sell goods. 

The Central School Arts and Humanities Center, located in the historical Charpentier District, is owned by the city. Charpentier is French for "carpenter", a reference to the carpenter-architects who built the mixed-style homes in the district. Central School features the Black Heritage Art Gallery, which is on the Louisiana African American Heritage Trail, as well as the Mardi Gras Museum of Imperial Calcasieu, which features extravagant costumes and an interactive float. It has the largest collection of Mardi Gras memorabilia in the South. Other studios and cultural activities include the Art Associates Gallery, Studio 347 Gallery, the Lake Charles Symphony, and the Lake Charles Community Band.

McNeese State University produces the annual Banners Series of various musical and theatrical performances. Banners also hosts lectures and presentations from notable persons and academics. Local theaters include the Lake Charles Little Theatre, the Artists Civic Theatre and Studio (ACTS), and the Children's Theatre.

Louisiana Pirate Festival 

Many festivals are held at the Civic Center. The most popular, the Louisiana Pirate Festival (formerly Contraband Days), is hosted on the Civic Center grounds and lakefront. The festival is a twelve-day annual festival held during the first two weeks of May. The celebrations are filled with savory Cajun food, family fun, and live entertainment, including several national acts. The festival is regularly attended by more than 200,000 people, making it one of the largest celebrations in Louisiana. In a reference to the legends of piracy on the lake and Contraband Bayou, the festival begins when the pirate Jean Lafitte and his crew capture the city and force the mayor to walk the plank.

Mardi Gras 

Mardi Gras in Lake Charles has a long history dating back to 1882, when Momus, King of Mardi Gras, landed his royal yacht at the foot of Pujo Street downtown. Throughout the two World Wars, Mardi Gras was downsized which led to a lack of participation by the area's youth. However, an interest in redeveloping the festivities arose, and the first Mardi Gras Ball in Lake Charles was staged in 1964. The full revival of Mardi Gras in Lake Charles was not realized until 1979, when several Krewe captains formed the "Krewe of Krewes", with the primary purpose of parading and promoting Mardi Gras for local residents. In 1985, Mardi Gras of Imperial Calcasieu, Inc. was formed by a group of civic-minded volunteers to further aid in the preservation of this festival. Mardi Gras in Lake Charles regularly draws in crowds of 150,000.

Cultural events
Some of the city's cultural events include Chuck Fest, Martin Luther King Festival, Livestock Show & Rodeo, Black Heritage Festival, Garden Festival, Palm Sunday Tour of Homes, Downtown at Sundown, Memorial Day Avenue of Flags, Crawfish Festival, Asian/American Culturefest, Cajun French, Creole, Zydeco Music & Zydeco Trail Rides,  Food Festivals, Marshland Festival, Gatorman Triathlon, Music & Food Festival, Arts Fest, and Riverside Fall Festival.

Libraries

Lake Charles has four libraries. The largest, with over 400,000 volumes, is Frazar Memorial Library, on the McNeese State University campus. The first library, Carnegie Memorial Library, was financed by Andrew Carnegie and opened in 1904. It also houses the Southwest Louisiana Genealogical and Historical Library. It, Central Library and Epps Memorial Library are part of the Calcasieu Parish Public Library, which has 13 locations in Calcasieu Parish.

Sports

Lake Charles is home to the McNeese Cowboys, whose football team hosts games at Cowboy Stadium which has a seating capacity of 17,410. Burton Coliseum hosts the McNeese basketball teams.

Lake Charles has been home to the Lake Charles Lakers and other minor-league baseball teams, indoor football teams, a minor-league ice hockey team and soccer teams.

Golf is popular at the city's Mallard Cove Golf Course. Other golf courses include Gray Plantation Golf Course, Lake Charles Country Club Golf Course, the Contraband Bayou Golf Club, and the Country Club at Golden Nugget. Gray Plantation Golf Course is featured on Louisiana's Audubon Golf Trail.

South Lake Charles Little League has had nationally winning teams televised on ESPN.

Parks and recreation

The city has 31 parks, many of which include playground equipment, athletic facilities, and walking paths. Shiver-Me-Timbers Millennium Park, located downtown, was built entirely by volunteers in 2000. Adventure Cove, a state-of-the-art park, was also built by volunteers, and is specifically designed for handicapped children. Hunting and fishing are popular with both residents and visitors to the Lake Area. An All-American Road, the Creole Nature Trail – "Louisiana's Outback" – brings tourists to Lake Charles and throughout Southwest Louisiana and Southeast Texas.

Government
Lake Charles has a mayor-council government. The elected officials include the mayor, the clerk of court, and seven city council members. Each council member represents a district within the city limits. One is elected president and presides over each meeting. The mayor serves a four-year term. The current mayor is Nic Hunter. The mayor appoints the city attorney.

The Lake Charles Police Department (LCPD) provides law enforcement and protection for the city. The police chief is appointed to a six-year term, and the fire chief is also appointed. The Lake Charles Fire Department has eight stations and 15 companies. McNeese State University also has its own police department, the McNeese State University Police Department.

The Lake Charles City Court's jurisdiction covers the city and Ward 3 in Calcasieu Parish. The Fourteenth Judicial District Court, in downtown Lake Charles, covers Calcasieu Parish and includes nine judges who preside over family, juvenile, civil, and criminal trials. Lake Charles is home to a United States District Court, also downtown. The Louisiana Third Circuit Court of Appeals is headquartered in the city.

Lake Charles is represented by Clay Higgins of Louisiana's 3rd congressional district. Most of the city is represented by Senator Jeremy Stine of District 27 in the Louisiana State Senate, though Mark Abraham's District 25 includes some neighborhoods of south Lake Charles.

Education

Universities and colleges

The city has one university and one community college. McNeese State University, on a  campus lined with oak trees in the heart of Lake Charles, is a four-year public university in the University of Louisiana System. Contraband Bayou flows through it. McNeese was founded in 1939 and named after educator John McNeese. It offers over 80 majors, and includes the colleges of Business, Education, Engineering and Engineering Technology, Liberal Arts, Nursing, Science, Honors College, and the Doré School of Graduate Studies. It is accredited by the Commission on Colleges of the Southern Association of Colleges and Schools. Over 8,500 students attend McNeese.

Sowela Technical Community College offers associate degrees, technical diplomas, certificate programs, and general education courses that can transfer to four-year universities. Delta School of Business and Technology specializes in vocational courses.

Primary and secondary schools
Lake Charles's public schools are operated by the Calcasieu Parish Public School System. There are two charter schools and several private schools. The Roman Catholic Diocese of Lake Charles operates and/or is affiliated with private Roman Catholic schools.

Media

Print
The most widely distributed, daily newspaper is The American Press. Other popular periodicals include Lagniappe Magazine, The Jambalaya News, Gumbeaux Magazine, and Thrive Magazine. The Contraband is McNeese State University's student newspaper.

Television
Major television network affiliates include KPLC 7, an NBC affiliate also operating the area's CW affiliate on its DT2 subchannel, KSWL-LD 17, a CBS affiliate, KLTL 18, a PBS member station, KWWE-LD 19, a MyNetworkTV/MeTV affiliate, and KVHP 29, a Fox affiliate also operating the area's ABC affiliate on its DT2 subchannel.

Radio
KBYS 88.3 Oldies, KRVS 88.7 Npr, KRLR 89.1 K-Love, KYLC 90.3, KOJO (FM) 91.1, KBAN 91.5, KTSR 92.1 Classic Rock, KHLA 92.9 Classic Hits, KPPM-LP 93.5 Black Gospel, KSMB 94.5 Top40(Chr), KYKZ 96.1 Country, KQLK 97.9 Country, W252AQ 98.3, KNGT 99.5 Country, KELB-LP 100.5, KKGB 101.3 Mainstream Rock, KYBG 102.1 Classic Hits, KAJN-FM 102.9 Contemporary Christian, KBIU 103.3 Chr, KLCJ 104.1 Oldies, KKMY 104.5 Rhythmic Top 40, KZWA 104.9 Urban Adult Contemporary, KIOC 106.1 Active Rock, KJMH 107.5 Urban, KLVI 560 News/Talk, KJEF 1290 Cajun Music, KAOK 1400 Talk, KLCL 1470 Urban Adult Contemporary, KHB42 162.400 NOAA Weather Radio

Infrastructure

Roads
The city's streets are laid out primarily in a grid pattern. Interstate 10 passes through Lake Charles, connecting the city with Houston to the west and New Orleans to the east. The Calcasieu River Bridge crosses the Calcasieu River and part of lake. About 50,000 vehicles pass over it daily. Despite its age of over 60 years, it is considered safe by the Louisiana DOTD.

Interstate 210 is an interstate highway bypass that loops through the southern portion of the city. The curving Israel LaFleur Bridge goes over the Calcasieu Ship Channel. This bridge has a 96% rating even after withstanding recent hurricanes. The loop has served Lake Charles commuters for 40 years, and carries about 40,000 vehicles per day.

Other major highways include U.S. Highway 90, which runs parallel with Interstate 10, and U.S. Highway 171, which connects the city to the north with Moss Bluff, DeRidder, and Shreveport. Highway 165, which runs northeast to Alexandria terminates at Highway 90 just a few miles east of the city. Louisiana Highway 14 ends at a junction with Highway 90, and runs south then east of the city.

Airports

Lake Charles is served by two airports. Lake Charles Regional Airport, located south of the city,  provides commercial airline service to Houston and Dallas. Chennault International Airport, while a fully operational airport, is an industrial and maintenance center. The latter airport, a former Strategic Air Command US Air Force base during the Cold War, is named for Maj. Gen. Claire Chennault, the aviator famous for commanding the Flying Tigers fighter group during World War II.

Seaports
The Port of Lake Charles is the thirteenth-busiest seaport in the United States, the fourth-largest liner service seaport in the U.S. Gulf, and a major West Gulf container load center. The City Docks in Lake Charles are the main hub of shipping activity.

Public transportation
Lake Charles Transit, the city's bus system, provides five routes throughout the city. It has one Greyhound bus station, and the Amtrak station serves the Sunset Limited train route.

Utilities
Electrical needs are provided by the energy company Entergy. The city provides drinking water and sewage service to residents within city limits. Water is treated at six water treatment facilities in the city.

Healthcare and medicine
Lake Charles is served by two hospitals with multiple locations. Christus St. Patrick Hospital operates the Lake Area Medical Center campus in south Lake Charles, and Lake Charles Memorial Hospital operates a birthing hospital called Lake Charles Memorial Hospital for Women.

In popular culture
 The musical Caroline, or Change by Tony Kushner, which was nominated for the Tony Award for Best Musical in 2004, is set in Lake Charles.
 Lake Charles is mentioned in Jack Kerouac's On the Road. After leaving Sal Paradise in Mexico, Dean Moriarty's car breaks down in Lake Charles.
 Lucinda Williams, singer and songwriter, wrote the song "Lake Charles" about her hometown.
 Lake Charles is mentioned as the traveler's destination in the song "Up on Cripple Creek" by The Band.

Films 
Lake Charles is featured or mentioned in The Drowning Pool, The Beyond, A Taste of Louisiana with Chef John Folse & Co., Passion Fish, Good Eats, UFC 22: There Can Be Only One Champion, UFC 24: First Defense, Blue Vinyl, Little Chenier, Mercy, Split Ends, All Over But to Cry, Film Hustle, Good Boy, and 10 Cloverfield Lane.
 In the 1969 film Easy Rider, the as-yet unfinished I-210 Israel LaFleur Bridge can be seen in the background of a motorcycle scene with Dennis Hopper and Peter Fonda traveling west through Lake Charles on the I-10 Interstate.

Sister cities

  Sioux City, Iowa, United States (1995)
  Perpignan, Pyrénées-Orientales, France (1993)
  Cobh, County Cork, Ireland (2008)

See also

 List of people from Lake Charles, Louisiana

References

External links

 City of Lake Charles official website
 Tourist information on Lake Charles
 SWLA Chamber – Economic Development Alliance

 
1861 establishments in Louisiana
Cities in Acadiana
Cities in Calcasieu Parish, Louisiana
Cities in Lake Charles metropolitan area
Cities in Louisiana
Louisiana African American Heritage Trail
Parish seats in Louisiana
Populated places established in 1861